The first USS Hazel (SP-1207) was a 44-foot-long 10-ton motor launch borrowed by the U.S. Navy during World War I. Hazel was armed as a patrol craft and was assigned to patrol the Virginia coast and the Chesapeake Bay. She was returned to her owner at war’s end.

Acquired in Virginia 
Hazel (SP-1207), a small motor boat, was acquired from her owner, J. W. Mathews, Chincoteague, Virginia, and commissioned 1 June 1917, Chief Boatswain's Mate D. J. Jester commanding.

World War I service
Assigned to the 5th Naval District – headquartered at Norfolk, Virginia --  Hazel operated as a patrol craft and performed general, harbor duties around Chincoteague Island and in Hampton Roads, Virginia. She occasionally made cruises up Chesapeake Bay as far as Annapolis, Maryland.

Post-war disposition
Hazel was returned to her owner 16 January 1919.

References
 

Patrol vessels of the United States Navy
World War I patrol vessels of the United States